al-Waqf is a Turkmen village in northern Aleppo Governorate, northern Syria.

References

Populated places in al-Bab District
Turkmen communities in Syria